

Oramics is a drawn sound technique designed in 1957 by musician Daphne Oram. The machine was further developed in 1962 after receiving a grant from the Gulbenkian Foundation.  The technique involves drawing on 35mm film strips to control the sound produced. Oramics was also the name used by Oram to refer to her studio and business interests generally.

Oram's composition machine consisted of a large rectangular metal frame, providing a table-like surface traversed by ten synchronised strips of clear, sprocketed 35mm film. The musician drew shapes on the film to create a mask, which modulated the light received by photocells. Although the output from the machine was monophonic, the sounds could be added to multitrack tapes to provide more texture and create polyphony.

The original machine was exhibited at the Science Museum in London between 2011 and 2015.

Related techniques 
The Oramics machine, which creates music from graphic elements uses similar principles to Yevgeny Sholpo's "Variophone", which produces sound by reading shapes cut into and drawings on cardboard. Canadian filmmakers Norman McLaren and Evelyn Lambart have made films that feature sounds created by drawing or printing various patterns, such as triangles and circles, along the optical soundtrack area of the film.

In 2016 Tom Richards, a PhD Student at Goldsmiths, University of London, re-imagined and built a working Mini-Oramics machine.

See also 

 ANS synthesizer
 Variophone
 RCA Synthesizer

References

Further reading

External links 

 
 
 
   

Mini Oramics machine

Video
  
 

BBC News
 
 

Graphical sound
Articles containing video clips